Arfordir Abereiddi is a Site of Special Scientific Interest (SSSI) in Pembrokeshire, South Wales. It has been designated as a Site of Special Scientific Interest since January 2002 in an attempt to protect its fragile biological and geological elements. The site has an area of 63.74 hectares and is managed by Natural Resources Wales.

Type and features
This SSSI has been notified as being of both geological and biological importance. The following features have been noted as Special Scientific Interest:
 Littoral Rock (Reef)
 Sea caves
 Saline Lagoon
 Grey seal (Halichoerus grypus)
 Arenig – Llanvirn GCR block
 Ordovician Igneous GCR block

See also
List of Sites of Special Scientific Interest in Pembrokeshire
 Abereiddy

References

External links
Natural Resources Wales website

Sites of Special Scientific Interest in Pembrokeshire